Dewey Macon "Nick" Johnson (April 6, 1907 – December 12, 1986) was an American politician in the state of Florida and a Democrat.

Johnson was born in Quincy, Florida in 1907 and attended schooling there. He later attended the University of Florida where he earned a law degree. He served in the Florida State Senate from 1941 to 1943 (9th district) and from 1951 to 1967 (6th district). In the 1967, session, he served as President of the Senate. Johnson also served in the Florida House of Representatives, having been elected in 1939, 1945, 1947 and 1949.

References

Businesspeople from Florida
Farmers from Florida
Democratic Party members of the Florida House of Representatives
Democratic Party Florida state senators
1907 births
1989 deaths
People from Quincy, Florida
Pork Chop Gang
20th-century American politicians
20th-century American businesspeople